Oligodon melanozonatus, also known as the Abor Hills kukri snake, is a species of snake found in Arunachal Pradesh in Northeast India and Tibet in Southwest China.

References

 Smith, M.A. 1943 The Fauna of British India, Ceylon and Burma, Including the Whole of the Indo-Chinese Sub-Region. Reptilia and Amphibia. 3 (Serpentes). Taylor and Francis, London. 583 pp.
 Wall, F. 1922 A new snake from the Northern frontier of Assam. Rec. Ind. Mus. xxiv: 29-30

melanozonatus
Snakes of China
Reptiles of India
Fauna of Tibet
Reptiles described in 1922
Taxa named by Frank Wall